The Spanish gold lynx or Lynx or Lince iberico of gold or Spanish Doubloon is a gold bullion coin issued by the Kingdom of Spain, minted for the first time in 2021 for the Spanish Royal Mint. Its grade is pure gold 999.9 (24 carats) according to Provision 14038 of BOE no. 198 of 2021. The quality of its minting is Proof Reverse, for which the motifs have a mirror shine while the background is matte.

Characteristics 

Description:

On the obverse the motifs and legends of a piece of eight, of the columnar type are reproduced: two hemispheres under the royal crown, flanked by the columns of Hercules with the motto PLUS VLTRA, all over a sea with waves. In the upper part, in a circular sense and in capital letters, appears the legend FELIPE VI REY DE ESPAÑA. At the bottom of the coin, in a circular direction, the legend 1 ONZA 999.9 ORO. The motifs and legends are surrounded by a beading of pine nuts.

An image of the head of an Iberian lynx is reproduced on the reverse. On your left the mint mark and the year of minting 2021. At the top of the coin, in two lines, the face value 1.5 EURO. At the bottom and in a circular direction, the legend LINCE IBÉRICO. The motifs and legends are surrounded by a beading of pine nuts.

Purity: 999.9 (24 karat) pure gold

Diameter: 37 mm

Weight: 1 ounce

Throw 

In 2021, the initial print run was made with 12,000 copies for the whole world.

References

External links 

 BOE.es - BOE-A-2021-14038 Orden ETD/890/2021, de 12 de agosto, por la que se acuerda la emisión, acuñación y puesta en circulación de monedas de colección dedicadas al "Lince Ibérico".

Bullion coins
Gold coins
Euro coins
Euro